Helionycta is a monotypic moth genus of the family Erebidae. Its only species, Helionycta grisea, is found in Bolivia. Both the genus and the species were first described by Köhler in 1979.

References

Calpinae
Monotypic moth genera